In human speech, egressive sounds are sounds in which the air stream is created by pushing air out through the mouth or nose.  The three types of egressive sounds are pulmonic egressive (from the lungs), glottalic egressive (from the glottis), and lingual (velaric) egressive (from the tongue). The opposite of an egressive sound is an ingressive sound, in which the airstream flows inward through the mouth or nose.

Pulmonic egressive
Pulmonic egressive sounds are those in which the air stream is created by the lungs, ribs, and diaphragm. The majority of sounds in most languages, such as vowels, are both pulmonic and egressive.  Pulmonic egressive sounds are found in all spoken languages.

Glottalic egressive
Glottalic egressive sounds are known as ejectives.

Lingual egressive
The lingual egressive, also known as velaric egressive, involves a double closure similar to that of the lingual ingressive sounds known as clicks, but with airflow in the opposite direction.  With the velum closed, the speaker forces air out of the mouth using either the tongue or cheeks, as in the French expression of dismissal. While not known to be used for normal vocabulary in any human language, apart from the extinct Australian ritual language Damin, a variation of this airstream mechanism is known to musicians as part of circular breathing.

See also

 Airstream mechanism
 Articulatory phonetics
 Ingressive sound

References

Phonetics
Consonants by airstream